Jessica Breach (born 4 November 1997) is an England women's national rugby union team international who also plays for Saracens.

International career 
Breach scored six tries on her international debut for England against Canada and scored five more on her second cap. Breach also played for England 7’s ahead of the 2018 Commonwealth Games where she won a bronze medal.

On February 10, 2019 Breach scored two tries as England ladies defeated France in the Six Nations Championship.

In 2018, she moved to England Sevens. She won a bronze medal as part of the team at the 2018 Commonwealth Games. She also played at the World Cup Sevens in San Francisco.

In January 2019, Breach returned to XVs and was awarded a full time contract with the England side. She played for the team in the 2019 Women's Six Nations Championship and topped the try-scoring charts for the tournament.

She missed the 2019 Super Series due to an shoulder injury but returned for the Autumn. Following the 2020 Six Nations, Jess has scored 22 tries in 13 tests.

She was named in the England squad for the delayed 2021 Rugby World Cup held in New Zealand in October and November 2022.

Club career 
Breach joined Aylesford Bulls Ladies in 2016, where she won a league and cup double before the club merged into Harlequins Women. She won the 2020–21 Premier 15s with Harlequins but missed the final due to an ankle injury.

Early life and education 
Breach grew up in Chichester. She started playing rugby at age six at Chichester RFC, she then joined pulborough RFC at age 14 and was national champion in her last year at the club. She won the European Sevens with England U18s in 2014 and 2015 and captained the talent development group side against Canada.

At school, alongside rugby, Breach was also a keen athlete and competed in sprint hurdling at the English Schools Athletics Championships. She also played netball and hockey, and was a county-level gymnast.

She was invited to England camps at the age of 16 and secured a spot in the England U18 training squad.

In 2019, she enrolled at St Mary's University to study Sports Communication and Marketing.

She is in a relationship with Harlequins player Archie White.

References

1997 births
Living people
Commonwealth Games bronze medallists for England
Commonwealth Games medallists in rugby sevens
England women's international rugby union players
England international women's rugby sevens players
English female rugby union players
Place of birth missing (living people)
Rugby sevens players at the 2018 Commonwealth Games
Rugby union players from Chichester
21st-century English women
Medallists at the 2018 Commonwealth Games